The following persons have held the office of mayor of Oklahoma City. Mayors of Oklahoma City are elected to four year terms.

List of mayors

Provisional mayors following land run

Elected mayors following Oklahoma City's incorporation

^Clarke served as acting mayor in 1889. Liebmann served as acting mayor for Kirk Humphreys' when Humphreys resigned to run for US Senate, serving until a special election could be held.

References

The City of Oklahoma City. Previous Mayors. OKC.gov. URL accessed 5 March 2007.

Oklahoma City